Charles A. Pearson may refer to:

 Charles Anthony Pearson (born 1956), younger son of the Third Viscount Cowdray and owner of Dunecht estate in Aberdeenshire
 Charles A. Pearson, mayor of Anaheim, California from 1940 until 1959

See also
Charles Pearson (disambiguation)